Karen Ellemann Kloch, formerly Karen Ellemann Karabian, (born 26 August 1969 in Charlottenlund) is a Danish politician, who is a member of the Folketing for the Venstre political party. She is a former minister, having held the positions of Minister of Fisheries, Equality and Nordic Cooperation, Minister of the Environment and Minister of the Interior and Social Affairs.

Ellemann is the daughter of former Foreign Minister, Uffe Ellemann-Jensen. She has a background as a teacher. She is married and has two children.

Political career
Ellemann was elected in the municipal council of Rudersdal Municipality at the 2005 Danish local elections. It was the first time she ran for a political office and became one of the most voted-for politicians in the municipality, receiving 1,502 votes. She ran with an agenda focused on children and healthcare.

Following the 2007 Danish general election Ellemann was elected into parliament. She received 13,513 votes, which gave her a direct seat in the Greater Copenhagen constituency. She was appointed Minister of Interior and Social Affairs in the Lars Løkke Rasmussen I Cabinet, starting 7 April 2009. On 23 February 2010 there was a cabinet reshuffle, which resulted in Ellemann becoming the new Minister for Environment and Nordic Cooperation. At the time she had not been involved in environmental politics, which was commented on by the Danish Society for Nature Conservation and the opposition parties. They were worried that she would be unable to stand up to the new Minister of Agriculture Henrik Høegh.

She was reelected at the 2011 Danish general election, receiving 8,476 votes. This was the second-most votes received by a Venstre-politician in the municipality, with only Søren Pind receiving more votes with 15,101. She was elected again in the 2015 election with 7,020 votes. After the election Venstre had majority support in the Folketing, and Lars Løkke Rasmussen became the prime minister again. In his cabinet Ellemann was appointed Minister of the Interior and Social Affairs. She held this position until 28 November 2016, where Venstre went into a coalition government with Liberal Alliance and Conservative People's Party in the Lars Løkke Rasmussen III Cabinet. She became Minister for Gender Equality and Nordic Cooperation. 7 August 2017 she also became the Minister for Fisheries after a scandal involving the former Minister of Food, Agriculture and Fisheries Esben Lunde Larsen forced him to resign that part of his ministry. On 2 May 2018 Ellemann left the government to become the leader of Venstre's parliamentary group. She was the first woman holding that position.

Ellemann was reelected in the 2019 Danish general election, receiving 8,238	votes.

References

External links

 

1969 births
Living people
People from Gentofte Municipality
Venstre (Denmark) politicians
21st-century Danish women politicians
Government ministers of Denmark
Women government ministers of Denmark
Female interior ministers
Danish Ministers for the Environment
Danish municipal councillors
Women members of the Folketing
Members of the Folketing 2007–2011
Members of the Folketing 2011–2015
Members of the Folketing 2015–2019
Members of the Folketing 2019–2022
Members of the Folketing 2022–2026